CMG Media Corporation (doing business as Cox Media Group) is an American media conglomerate principally owned by Apollo Global Management in conjunction with Cox Enterprises, which maintains a 29% minority stake in the company. The company primarily owns radio and television stations—many of which are located in the South, Pacific Northwest, Eastern Midwest, and Northeast, and the regional cable news network Pittsburgh Cable News Channel (PCNC).

Originally founded in December 2008 by Cox Enterprises through a consolidation of its existing publishing and broadcasting subsidiaries, the current incarnation of Cox Media Group was formed on December 17, 2019, through the acquisition by Apollo of the original Cox Media Group (along with Cox Enterprises’ advertising subsidiary, Gamut) from Cox Enterprises, which transferred a controlling interest in the company to Apollo, and Northwest Broadcasting from Brian Brady.

History

In December 2008, Cox Enterprises created Cox Media Group (CMG) by merging Cox Newspapers, Cox Radio, and Cox Television into one integrated digital media company. The creation of Cox Media Group was a departure from grouping subsidiaries based solely on publishing medium.

In August 2009, Cox Enterprises realigned its radio, television, newspaper/publishing, and digital assets into the same division. Under the new structure, while the local brands remain independent, they share resources and some management. Dayton, Ohio, was considered the prototype for the media group, where radio, television, newspaper, and direct mail were all in the same market, and were combined into a new building. In other markets where the facilities are not as close together, they do share some senior management; for example, Houston and San Antonio Radio and the Austin American-Statesman newspaper all fall under the same regional vice president. In addition to the radio/TV stations and newspapers, Cox Media Group encompasses Cox Digital Solutions (digital sales for both Cox and non-Cox online and mobile properties), Cox Reps (national TV sales for station groups such as Gray and Tegna), Kudzu.com, Savings.com, and Valpak direct mail.

CMG introduced a new group-buying discount program called DealSwarm in October 2010. DealSwarm provides online discounts at local businesses. The program is active in such Cox Media Group properties as Atlanta, Austin and Dayton.

In July 2012, CMG announced its intention to sell its radio stations in smaller markets: Birmingham, Greenville, Hawaii, Louisville, Richmond, and Southern Connecticut. It also intends to spin off its smaller-market television stations in El Paso, Johnstown, Reno, and Steubenville. The company said it intended to focus on larger markets or smaller markets that could be clustered together with other CMG properties.

In April 2013, CMG launched the online-only new site Rare.us as a conservative media source, originally with the tagline "Red is the Center", and more recently "America’s News Feed". After initially-low audience numbers, the site expanded dramatically following more prominent use of social media and a more diverse range of stories.

On February 12, 2013, CMG announced the sale of the Birmingham, Greenville, Hawaii, Louisville, and Richmond radio stations to SummitMedia, and the southern Connecticut stations to Connoisseur Media; two weeks later, on February 25, the company announced the sale of the four television stations (and the local marketing agreement for a fifth) to Sinclair Broadcast Group.

In October 2014, Cox Digital Solutions became Gamut. Smart Media from Cox., offering media solutions to address the evolution of over-the-top media services (OTT). With this transition, CMG will cover linear television and radio, and Gamut will focus on OTT/CTV.

Sale of majority stake to Apollo Global Management 
On July 24, 2018, Cox Enterprises announced that it was "exploring strategic options" for Cox Media Group's television stations, which the company said could involve "partnering or merging these stations into a larger TV company." Cox Media Group's president, Kim Guthrie, subsequently clarified to trade publication Radio & Television Business Report that the company was solely seeking "a merger or partnership" and not an outright sale of the television stations.

On February 15, 2019, Cox announced that Apollo Global Management would acquire a majority interest in the CMG television stations, as well as the Dayton radio stations and Ohio newspapers (whose operations are integrated with WHIO-TV), forming a new company that retains Cox Media Group's management and operating structure; Cox Enterprises holds a minority stake in this company. Cox's other radio stations, as well as The Atlanta Journal-Constitution, were not included in the deal; Cox had previously said that any deal involving the television stations would not include radio stations or newspapers. In March 2019 filings with the Federal Communications Commission (FCC), Apollo disclosed that the new company, tentatively named Terrier Media, would purchase the Cox stations for $3.1 billion (reduced by the value of Cox's equity stake in Terrier).

On March 18, 2019, the Atlanta Business Chronicle reported that Cox Enterprises was "exploring options" for its radio stations. The Atlanta Journal-Constitution would not be included in any potential deal for the stations.

On June 26, 2019, Cox announced that the radio stations, as well as national advertising business – CoxReps, and local OTT advertising agency - Gamut, would also be acquired by the Apollo Global Management-backed company, which concurrently announced that it would retain the Cox Media Group name instead of Terrier Media. As they would no longer be grandfathered, the new company must divest a radio station each in the Orlando and Tampa Bay markets.

Both acquisitions, along with Apollo's concurrent $384 million acquisition of Northwest Broadcasting, were approved by the FCC on November 22, 2019, under conditions imposed after a federal court blocked changes to several FCC ownership policies. To comply with regulations prohibiting the cross-ownership of broadcast stations and daily newspapers (which the FCC had sought to repeal), CMG agreed to cut publication of its Ohio newspapers to three days a week within 30 days of the deal's completion; Cox Enterprises also reduced its stake in CMG to a nonattributable interest, eliminating an ownership conflict with The Atlanta Journal-Constitution. CMG was also required to surrender the licenses to two of Northwest Broadcasting's stations, in Yuma, Arizona, and Syracuse, New York, where Northwest's existing duopolies did not comply with reinstated provisions of the FCC's duopoly rule. Cox announced the closing of the acquisition on December 17, 2019.

On February 10, 2020, Cox Enterprises announced it would repurchase the Dayton Daily News, Journal-News, and Springfield News-Sun from CMG, once again owning a 100% interest in the newspapers; the sale, which reunited the papers with The Atlanta Journal-Constitution in Cox Enterprises' newspaper holdings, allowed them to continue daily publication despite the court ruling. The sale was officially closed on March 2.

On February 22, 2022, a partnership of Standard General and Apollo announced their intent to acquire Tegna; Apollo will hold non-voting shares in the company. As part of the sale, Standard General will sell Standard Media's WDKA, WLNE, KBSI, and KLKN to CMG, and CMG will also acquire Tegna's stations in Dallas–Fort Worth, Houston, and Austin (including WFAA, KHOU, and KVUE). WFXT will be divested to Standard General. The sale was approved by Standard General and Apollo Global Management on May 17, 2022.

On March 30, 2022, Cox Media Group announced that it would sell 18 stations, namely KYMA in Yuma, Arizona; KIEM and KVIQ-LD in Eureka, California; KPVI in Idaho Falls, Idaho; KLAX in Alexandria, Louisiana; WABG, WNBD and WXVT in Greenwood, Mississippi; WICZ in Binghamton, New York; WSYT in Syracuse, New York; KOKI and KMYT in Tulsa, Oklahoma; KMVU and KFBI-LD in Medford, Oregon; WHBQ in Memphis, Tennessee; KAYU in Spokane, Washington; and KCYU-LD and KFFX in Yakima, Washington to Imagicomm Communications—a shell company affiliated with the cable network INSP—for an undisclosed amount. The sale was completed on August 1.

Cox Radio
Cox Media Group owns, operates or provides sales and marketing services to 57 stations in 20 markets. This radio portfolio includes 15 AM stations and 71 FM stations.

Cox Radio became a public company, majority owned by Cox Enterprises, in 1996. Around April 2009, Cox Enterprises proposed a US$69-million takeover offer of Cox Radio. The offer expired on May 1, 2009. The offer was later raised to $4.80 a share, and the expiration was pushed to May 13. The offer was accepted, and the acquisition was completed on June 1.

Talk shows
Clark Howard* (syndicated by Westwood One)
Rick and Bubba (syndication handled by Syndicated Solutions)
 * = Broadcast from Atlanta

Cox Radio-owned radio stations

Note: 
(**) — indicates a station built and signed on by Cox.

 Current

 Former

Cox Television

Cox Television-owned television stations
Stations are listed in alphabetical order by state and city of license.

Note:
 (**) - Indicates a station built and signed on by Cox.
 (††) - Indicates a station that was acquired by Cox from Newport Television in 2012.
 (ƒ) - Indicates a station that was acquired by Cox from Fox Television Stations in 2014.
 (¤¤) - Indicates a station that was owned by Northwest Broadcasting prior to its acquisition by CMG in 2019.

Current 

Notes:
 1 WJAX-TV is owned by Hoffman Communications, Inc.; CMG operates the station under a shared services agreement.

Former 

Notes:
 1 Owned by CMG, News-Press & Gazette Company operated KYMA via a shared services agreement. In January 2020, CMG surrendered the license of KYMA (which the callsign was subsequently changed to KSWT), and moved its NBC programming to a subchannel to KSWT (which the callsign was subsequently changed to KYMA).
 2 Co-owned with Knight Newspapers until 1962 in an equally-divided joint venture.
 3 Owned by John Wagner; CMG operated WFXW under a shared services agreement.
 4 KAME-TV owned by Ellis Communications, Cox operated this station under a joint sales agreement, along with sister-station KRXI-TV.

Cox Television-owned cable channels
 Pittsburgh Cable News Channel, airs on various different channels within the Pittsburgh metropolitan area. Operated by WPXI.

Subsidiaries

Gamut
Gamut is a Cox Media Group company that specializes in local over-the-top (OTT) video advertising solutions, whereas Cox Media Group focuses on linear television and radio. Headquartered in New York, New York, Gamut has eight offices in the US. Gamut's core product, Gamut TOTAL, places OTT advertising campaigns directly through publishers' ad servers, including Discovery Inc.’s networks.

Former assets
The following outlets were at one time owned by subsidiary Cox Newspapers Inc. or CMG:

Daily newspapers 
Dayton Daily News, Dayton, Ohio
Journal-News, Hamilton, Ohio
Springfield News-Sun, Springfield, Ohio
The Atlanta Journal-Constitution, Atlanta
Austin American-Statesman, Austin, Texas
Chandler Arizonan, Chandler, Arizona
The Daily Advance, Elizabeth City, North Carolina
The Daily Reflector, Greenville, North Carolina
The Daily Sentinel, Nacogdoches, Texas
The Grand Junction Daily Sentinel, Grand Junction, Colorado
Longview News-Journal, Longview, Texas
The Lufkin Daily News, Lufkin, Texas
The Marshall News Messenger, Marshall, Texas
Mesa Tribune, Mesa, Arizona
Miami News, Miami, Florida
Orange Leader, Orange, Texas
Palm Beach Daily News, Palm Beach, Florida
The Palm Beach Post, West Palm Beach, Florida
Palo Verde Valley Times, Blythe, California
Port Arthur News, Port Arthur, Texas
Rocky Mount Telegram, Rocky Mount, North Carolina
Scottsdale Progress, Mesa, Arizona
Tempe Daily News, Tempe, Arizona
Waco Tribune-Herald, Waco, Texas

Weekly newspapers 
 Beaufort-Hyde News, Belhaven, North Carolina
 Bertie Ledger-Advance, Windsor, North Carolina
 The Chowan Herald, Edenton, North Carolina
 The Duplin Times, Kenansville, North Carolina
 The Enterprise, Williamston, North Carolina
 Farmville Enterprise, North Carolina
 The Nickel-Grand Junction, Grand Junction, Colorado
 Perquimans Weekly, Elizabeth City, North Carolina
 Standard Laconic, Snow Hill, North Carolina
 Times-Leader, Ayden-Grifton, North Carolina
 Weekly Herald, Robersonville, North Carolina

Websites
 Rare, Washington, D.C.

References

External links
 

 
Cox Enterprises
Apollo Global Management companies
Mass media companies of the United States
Companies based in Atlanta
Newspaper companies of the United States
Radio broadcasting companies of the United States
Television broadcasting companies of the United States
Cable network groups in the United States
Mass media companies established in 2008
American companies established in 2008
2008 establishments in Georgia (U.S. state)
2019 mergers and acquisitions